Shimane Vogel Park, or Matsue Vogel Park, is an aviary park in Shimane Prefecture, on the Sea of Japan.
Amid pleasant green hills on the north shore of Lake Shinji, it has paved walkways between four aviaries holding tropical birds - mostly toucans, turacos, hornbills and ibises. The park is also home to various birds from around the world, including rare and exotic birds. There are also a number of waterfowl to be found in the aquatic birds aviary. Vogel Park also includes such birds as emus and penguins.↵An owl flight show is exhibited four times a day.

Vogel Park boasts one of the largest greenhouses in the world, residence to various flowers of which most are found in bloom year-round. Begonia, Fuchsia and Coleus flowers are an example of some that can be admired at the park.

External links 

 Official homepage

Zoos in Japan
Buildings and structures in Shimane Prefecture
Bird parks
Gardens in Shimane Prefecture
Greenhouses in Japan
Zoos established in 2001
Articles needing infobox zoo
2001 establishments in Japan